Han-bin Lee (also known as Lee Han-bin and Hahn-Been Lee) was a South Korean politician and diplomat who served as the 14th Deputy Prime Minister of the Fourth Republic of Korea.

Lee served as South Korea's Ambassador to Switzerland from 1963 to 1965. During this time Lee was instrumental in establishing the Embassy of the Republic of Korea in Switzerland. In 1979, Lee became South Korea's 14th Deputy Prime Minister of the Fourth Republic of Korea.  As Deputy Prime Minister and minister of the Economic Planning Board of Korea, Lee contributed to maintaining Korea's economic stability by leading the nation's economic policies.

The Lee Han-bin Hope Scholarship at Seoul National University provides student scholarships to the Graduate School of Public Administration.

Works 
Administrative reforms in Asia

A Handbook of Development Administration Curriculum

A case of institution building on the foundation of a university technical assistance contract

An application of innovation theory to the strategy of administrative reform in developing countries

The role of the higher civil service under rapid social and political change

Developmentalist time and leadership in developing countries

Generating momentum toward a Pacific community

Goals for the Pacific community in the 21st century

A thematic approach to program development : the case of the East-West Technology Development Institute

An Application of Innovation Theory to the Strategy of Administrative Reform in Developing Countries

See also 
Prime Minister of South Korea

List of prime ministers of South Korea

Foreign relations of South Korea

References 

Deputy Prime Ministers of South Korea
Fourth Republic of Korea
Harvard University alumni
Government ministers of South Korea
Finance ministers of South Korea
1926 births
2004 deaths
Seoul National University alumni
Presidents of universities and colleges in South Korea